The 2020–21 Northern Colorado Bears men's basketball team represented the University of Northern Colorado in the 2020–21 NCAA Division I men's basketball season. The Bears, led by first-year head coach Steve Smiley, played their home games at Bank of Colorado Arena in Greeley, Colorado as members of the Big Sky Conference. They finished the season 11-11, 6-8 in Big Sky Play to finish a tie for 7th place. They defeated Sacramento State in the first round before losing in the quarterfinals to Southern Utah.

Previous season
The Bears finished the 2019–20 season 22–9, 15–5 Big Sky play to finish in second place. Due to the ongoing coronavirus pandemic, all postseason tournaments were canceled including the Big Sky tournament.

On March 17, 2020, head coach Jeff Linder was named the head coach at Wyoming. A few days later, the school promoted assistant coach Steve Smiley as the school's new head coach.

Roster

Schedule and results

|-
!colspan=12 style=| Regular season

|-
!colspan=12 style=| Big Sky tournament
|-

|-

Source

References

Northern Colorado Bears men's basketball seasons
Northern Colorado Bears
Northern Colorado Bears men's basketball
Northern Colorado Bears men's basketball